The 2010 FIFA World Cup qualification UEFA Group 9 was a UEFA qualifying group for the 2010 FIFA World Cup. The group comprised the Netherlands, Scotland, Norway, Iceland and Macedonia. This group had one team fewer than the other eight.

The group was won by the Netherlands, who qualified for the 2010 FIFA World Cup without dropping a single point in qualification. As runners-up, Norway were in contention for the UEFA play-off stage, but their record was the worst of all runners-up, and so they were eliminated.

Standings

Matches
The fixtures were decided at a meeting held in Amsterdam, Netherlands on 14 December 2007. The August 2009 date in the international match calendar was moved forward by one week, from 19 August 2009 to 12 August 2009, at the FIFA Executive Committee meeting on 27 May 2008.

Goalscorers
There were 44 goals scored over 20 games, for an average of 2.2 goals per game.

3 goals
 Eiður Guðjohnsen
 Klaas-Jan Huntelaar
 Dirk Kuyt
 John Arne Riise

2 goals

 Mark van Bommel
 Rafael van der Vaart
 Steffen Iversen
 Morten Gamst Pedersen
 James McFadden

1 goal

 Heiðar Helguson
 Veigar Páll Gunnarsson
 Indriði Sigurðsson
 Kristján Örn Sigurðsson
 Boban Grncarov
 Filip Ivanovski
 Ilčo Naumoski
 Goran Pandev
 Aco Stojkov
 Eljero Elia
 Nigel de Jong
 John Heitinga
 Joris Mathijsen
 André Ooijer
 Robin van Persie
 Arjen Robben
 Thorstein Helstad
 Erik Huseklepp
 Kirk Broadfoot
 Scott Brown
 Steven Fletcher
 Ross McCormack

Attendances

References

9
2008–09 in Scottish football
2009–10 in Scottish football
2008–09 in Republic of Macedonia football
2009–10 in Republic of Macedonia football
2008–09 in Dutch football
qual
2008 in Icelandic football
2009 in Icelandic football
2008 in Norwegian football
2009 in Norwegian football